Radiofreccia, released in 1998, is the first movie directed by Italian rock singer-songwriter Luciano Ligabue, based on his 1997 debut novel Fuori e dentro il Borgo.

It features the singer-songwriter Francesco Guccini (with whom Ligabue also collaborated for a song) in a small role.

Cast
Stefano Accorsi as Freccia
Luciano Federico as Bruno
Cosima Coccheri as Ragazza eroinomane
Paolo Cremonini as Omero
Fulvio Farnetti as Virus
Ottorino Ferrari as Pluto
Serena Grandi as Madre di Freccia
Francesco Guccini as Adolfo

References

External links

 

1990s Italian-language films
Italian drama films
1998 films
1990s Italian films
Fandango (Italian company) films